Dolichoderus mucronifer is a species of ant in the genus Dolichoderus. Described by Roger in 1862, the species is endemic to French Guiana and Suriname.

References

Dolichoderus
Hymenoptera of South America
Insects described in 1862